Lonnie Ford (born February 21, 1979) is an Arena Football League fullback–defensive end for the Los Angeles Avengers.

Professional career
Ford signed a free agent contract with the Carolina Panthers following the 2002 NFL Draft, but was released.  He has played for the Avengers since 2003.

Music
Ford is also the founder of DueceFive.biz

High school career
Ford attended Morse High School in San Diego, California, and was a standout in football, basketball, and track and field. In football, he was a tight end and defensive end, and as a senior, he made 31 receptions for 342 yards (11.03 yards per rec. avg.) and four touchdowns on offense, and on defense, he posted 19 sacks, five forced fumbles, and many tackles. In basketball, he averaged 10.5 points per game as a senior. In track and field, he threw personal bests of 53-1 on the shot put, and 158-0 on the discus. In 1997, the San Diego Union-Tribune named Ford its "Male Athlete of the Year."

College career
Ford attended the University of Southern California. As a senior, he made seven sacks, 40 tackles, and four forced fumbles, was an All-Pacific-10 Conference second team selection, was voted as USC's "Defensive Lineman of the Year", and was named the "Player of the Game" in a game against the University of Notre Dame.

External links
AFL page
https://web.archive.org/web/20100304000117/http://duecefive.biz/
https://web.archive.org/web/20100324215625/http://fordsports.us/

1979 births
Living people
Players of American football from San Diego
American football defensive ends
American football fullbacks
USC Trojans football players
Los Angeles Avengers players
University of Southern California alumni